Ernest Grvala (born 11 October 1996) is a Slovenian footballer who plays for SC Pinkafeld in Austria as a midfielder.

References

External links
NZS profile 

1996 births
Living people
Sportspeople from Jesenice, Jesenice
Slovenian footballers
Slovenia youth international footballers
Slovenian expatriate footballers
Association football wingers
NK Triglav Kranj players
NK Domžale players
NK Radomlje players
NK Dob players
NK GOŠK Gabela players
FC Arda Kardzhali players
Premier League of Bosnia and Herzegovina players
Slovenian PrvaLiga players
Slovenian Second League players
Expatriate footballers in Bosnia and Herzegovina
Expatriate footballers in Bulgaria
Expatriate footballers in Austria
Slovenian expatriate sportspeople in Bosnia and Herzegovina
Slovenian expatriate sportspeople in Bulgaria
Slovenian expatriate sportspeople in Austria